The Chatsworth Formation is a Cretaceous period sandstone geologic formation in the Simi Hills and western Santa Susana Mountains of southern California.

It is found in western Los Angeles County and eastern Ventura County.

Fossils
The sedimentary marine formation preserves fossils dating from the Middle Campanian to Early Maestrichtian epochs of the Cretaceous period. It has diverse molluscan faunas.

The most common taxa are:
ringiculid Biplica 
naticids Gyrodes and Euspira
trocid Atira
aporrhaids Anchuras and Lispodesthes
turritellid Turritella
perissityid Perissitys

See also

 Stoney Point (California) — Chatsworth Formation landmark.
 
 
 List of fossiliferous stratigraphic units in California
 Paleontology in California

References

Cretaceous California
Sandstone formations of the United States
Campanian Stage
Maastrichtian Stage of North America
Geology of Los Angeles County, California
Geology of Ventura County, California
Simi Hills
Santa Susana Mountains
Cretaceous fossil record
Upper Cretaceous Series of North America
Paleontology in California
Chatsworth, Los Angeles
Geography of Simi Valley, California
West Hills, Los Angeles
Geologic formations of California